Alando Terrelonge is a Jamaican politician from the Labour Party.

Education 

 Campion College
 University of the West Indies at Cave Hill
 Norman Manley Law School
 University of Warwick

Ministerial offices 

 March 2018 – Minister of State in the Ministry of Culture, Gender, Entertainment and Sports
 February 2019 – Minister of State in the Ministry of Education, Youth & Information
 September 2020 – Minister of State in the Ministry of Culture, Gender, Entertainment and Sport

References 

Living people
Government ministers of Jamaica
21st-century Jamaican politicians
Members of the House of Representatives of Jamaica
Jamaica Labour Party politicians
People from Saint Catherine Parish
People associated with the Norman Manley Law School
University of the West Indies alumni
Alumni of the University of Warwick
Year of birth missing (living people)
Members of the 13th Parliament of Jamaica
Members of the 14th Parliament of Jamaica